Joseph "Jo" Abbott (January 15, 1840 – February 11, 1908) was a member of the Confederate States Army and a member of the United States House of Representatives from Texas.

Biography
Abbott was born January 15, 1840, in Morgan County, Alabama near Decatur and attended the public schools. He moved with his parents to Freestone County, Texas, in 1853.

During the American Civil War, he served as a first lieutenant in the Twelfth Regiment of the Texas Cavalry. The war over, he resumed his law studies, and being licensed in October, 1866, began his legal practice in Springfield, Limestone County, Texas. He later moved to Hillsboro, Texas where he continued his legal career.

He was a member of the Texas House of Representatives in 1870 and 1871.  He was appointed a district judge in the Twenty-Eighth judicial district by Governor Oran M. Roberts. In 1880, he was elected for a full four-year term for that position. In 1886, he was elected as a Democrat to the United States House of Representatives, and served in that capacity through the end of Fifty-Fourth Congress in 1897. Upon leaving Congress, he resumed his legal career in Hillsboro, Texas, where he died on February 11, 1908.

References

 Retrieved on 2008-02-13
 Biographical Directory of the United States Congress, 1774-1989: Bicentennial Edition.'' United States: Government Printing Office, 1989.

External links
 Joseph Abbott in the Handbook of Texas

1840 births
1908 deaths
Politicians from Decatur, Alabama
Democratic Party members of the Texas House of Representatives
Texas state court judges
Confederate States Army officers
People from Freestone County, Texas
People from Hillsboro, Texas
People from Limestone County, Texas
Democratic Party members of the United States House of Representatives from Texas
19th-century American politicians
19th-century American judges
Military personnel from Texas